Andreas Ludwig Kalcker is a German resident in Switzerland who has dedicated himself to the promotion of the Miracle Mineral Solution (MMS), whose consumption can cause abdominal pain, nausea, vomiting, diarrhea, intoxication or kidney failure. Kalcker has advertised the product as a definitive cure for cancer, AIDS, autism, hepatitis, diabetes, arthritis and all kinds of diseases, as well as the perfect antioxidant. Kalcker has been investigated, sued and arrested for this reason. Before moving to Switzerland, Kalcker lived in Spain for several years.

On 24 October 2012 Kalcker was arrested in Ibiza by agents of the Spanish Civil Guard Anti-Drug and Organized Crime Team for violating Spanish public health protection laws.

In 2018 the Official College of Doctors of Alicante (COMA in Spanish) called for a boycott of a Kalcker event to promote the MMS, warning of the danger of consuming the substance and denouncing that MMS "is nothing more than industrial bleach diluted to 28% and mixed with citric acid", whose ingestion can produce adverse effects, being a substance banned in Spain for human consumption and that its alleged healing power was nothing more than a fraudulent message. The event was cancelled by the hotel, located on the beach of San Juan. After Kalcker sued the president of the COMA for warning about the event, María Isabel Moya, the Provincial Court of Alicante ratified that there was no criminal infraction for her statements, considering that "the president acted in the exercise of her competences and in her duty to protect the health of the general public".

In 2019, the Spanish Attorney General started an investigation in which Kalcker was charged for crime against public health, having as its origin a complaint filed in October 2018 by the Ministry of Health, which warned of the "publication and sale" through the Internet of sodium chlorite.

In 2021 an Argentine lawyer filed a lawsuit against Kalcker following the death of a five-year-old boy in Neuquén Province who ingested chlorine dioxide, a chemical compound promoted by Kalcker as a cure for COVID-19. The lawyer filed the complaint before the Public Prosecutor's Office of Argentina for the commission of crimes against public health, arguing that the accused in a "completely fraudulent and illegal manner are selling the substance in question, putting in critical danger an innumerable number of Argentine compatriots".

References 

Living people
German emigrants to Switzerland
Health fraud
Year of birth missing (living people)